Annefried Göllner (born 27 August 1963) is an Austrian luger. She competed at the 1980 Winter Olympics and the 1984 Winter Olympics.

References

External links
 

1963 births
Living people
Austrian female lugers
Olympic lugers of Austria
Lugers at the 1980 Winter Olympics
Lugers at the 1984 Winter Olympics
People from Zams
Sportspeople from Tyrol (state)